Emmanuel Marc (born November 17, 1982) is a former professional Canadian football running back in the Canadian Football League.

Marc was signed in February, 2010 by Winnipeg Blue Bombers and was a late cut in training camp. He then signed with the Montreal Alouettes. He was released by the Alouettes on May 7, 2012. On October 5, 2012, Marc was signed by the Toronto Argonauts, but was released by the team on November 10, 2012.  He was also a member of the BC Lions in 2009. He played college football for the Delaware State Hornets.

References

External links
Toronto Argonauts bio

1982 births
Living people
People from Spring Valley, New York
American players of Canadian football
American football running backs
Canadian football running backs
Delaware State Hornets football players
BC Lions players